Ángel Luis García García (born July 11, 1988) is a Puerto Rican professional basketball player for Cariduros de Fajardo of the Baloncesto Superior Nacional (BSN). García began playing basketball in his native municipality, before moving to Lake Forest, Illinois, and playing one year for Lake Forest Academy, then transferring to East Chicago, Indiana, where he attended East Chicago Central High School. García, Kawann Short and E'Twaun Moore led E.C. Central to a 23-3 overall record and won the Indiana Class 4A state title.

While in high school, he was included in the World Team that participated in the Nike Hoops Summit. García was recruited to the University of Memphis by John Calipari, but was unable to play during his freshman year after confronting difficulties to meet the standards of the National Collegiate Athletic Association Eligibility Center. After being cleared, he was included in the roster but suffered an MCL injury that kept him inactive for months. Despite being expected to miss the entire season, García was cleared to play in February, participating with the team throughout the final stages of the season and post-season tournaments.

 In December 2010, he decided to sign with CB Málaga of the Liga ACB in Spain after playing only limited time in the gaming scheme of Memphis' new coach, Josh Pastner. García debuted as a professional in the team's LEB Oro affiliate CB Axarquía.

In 2011, García signed to play for CB Granada.  García tore the ligaments of his right knee on 11 October during a practice with the C.B. Granada team.

In 2013 the Puerto Rico BSN his draft with the Piratas de Quebradillas was traded for Vaqueros de Bayamon.

References

External links
Ángel García at Spanish Basketball Federation

1988 births
Living people
People from Toa Baja, Puerto Rico
Lake Forest Academy alumni
Caciques de Humacao players
CB Granada players
Memphis Tigers men's basketball players
Piratas de Quebradillas players
Power forwards (basketball)
Puerto Rican men's basketball players
Puerto Rican expatriate sportspeople in Spain
Puerto Rico men's national basketball team players
Toyama Grouses players